The electoral district of Pascoe Vale is an electoral district of the Victorian Legislative Assembly.

Members

Election results

References

External links
 Electorate profile: Pascoe Vale District, Victorian Electoral Commission

Electoral districts of Victoria (Australia)
1955 establishments in Australia
1958 disestablishments in Australia
1985 establishments in Australia
City of Merri-bek
Electoral districts and divisions of Greater Melbourne